Meghan Roche (born September 13, 2000) is an American fashion model.

Career 
Roche originally signed with Women Management at age 15, and debuted as a Givenchy exclusive, including a campaign shot by Steven Meisel. The next season, F/W 2018, Roche was a semi-exclusive for Alexander Wang and also walked for brands including Derek Lam, Carolina Herrera, Fendi (which she opened), Versace, Yves Saint Laurent, Ralph Lauren, Max Mara, Tod's, Missoni, Off-White, Chanel, Sonia Rykiel, Stella McCartney, H&M, Dolce & Gabbana, and Roberto Cavalli.

In 2018, Roche was deemed a "Top Newcomer" by models.com.

Roche signed with IMG Models in 2019. In 2019, her former agency Women Management sued her current agency IMG Models for an alleged breach of contract for what is known as "poaching" her to the rival agency as her career expanded, including campaigns for Marc Jacobs and Miu Miu.

References 

Living people
People from Yardley, Pennsylvania
Female models from Pennsylvania
IMG Models models
2000 births